Derbyshire County Cricket Club in 1963 was the cricket season when the English club Derbyshire had been playing for ninety-two years. It was their fifty-ninth season in the County Championship and they won two championship matches and lost fourteen to finish seventeenth in the County Championship. It was the first season in which the Gillette Cup was played, and Derbyshire reached the quarter finals.

1963 season

Derbyshire played 28 games in the County Championship, one match against the Pakistani Eaglets, one against the touring West Indies and one match against Cambridge University.  They won three first class matches, lost fifteen matches and drew thirteen matches. They won their first round match in the Gillette Cup, but lost in the Quarter Final. Charles Lee was captain and scored most runs. Harold Rhodes took most wickets for the club.

There were several new players in the Derbyshire team. Brian Jackson made a large contribution with his bowling over six seasons. John Harvey played for another ten years and John Eyre for five. Roger de Ville appeared twice in the season and once in the following season.

Matches

First Class

{| class="wikitable" width="100%"
! bgcolor="#efefef" colspan=6 | List of matches
|- bgcolor="#efefef"
!No.
!Date
!V
!Result 
!Margin
!Notes
|-
|1
|8 May 1963  
 | Surrey  Kennington Oval   
|bgcolor="#FF0000"|Lost 
 |  Innings and 6 runs
|    Edrich 125 
|- 
|2
|11 May 1963  
 | Gloucestershire  County Ground, Derby   
|bgcolor="#FF0000"|Lost 
 |  4 wickets
|    Brown 6–48 and 7–48
|- 
|3
|15 May 1963  
 | Somerset  Ind Coope Ground, Burton-on-Trent   
|bgcolor="#FF0000"|Lost 
 |  Innings and 80 runs
|    Wright 151 
|- 
|4
|18 May 1963  
 | Worcestershire   Queen's Park, Chesterfield   
|bgcolor="#FFCC00"|Drawn
 |  
|    Coldwell 6–43
|- 
|5
|25 May 1963  
 | Glamorgan St Helen's, Swansea   
|bgcolor="#FFCC00"|Drawn
 |  
|    C Lee 104; Oates 99; Pressdee 6–58
|- 
|6
|29 May 1963  
 | Essex  Gidea Park Sports Ground, Romford   
|bgcolor="#FF0000"|Lost 
 |  80 runs
|    Knight 5–46
|- 
|7
|1 Jun 1963  
 | Warwickshire  Edgbaston, Birmingham   
|bgcolor="#FF0000"|Lost 
 |  10 wickets
|    Horner 102; Hitchcock 106; Barber 6–74 
|- 
|8
|5 Jun 1963  
 | Northamptonshire  County Ground, Derby   
|bgcolor="#FF0000"|Lost 
 |  4 wickets
|    IW Hall 136; HL Jackson 6–69 
|- 
|9
|8 Jun 1963  
 | Yorkshire   Queen's Park, Chesterfield   
|bgcolor="#FF0000"|Lost 
 |  Innings and 56 runs
|    Padgett 142; Sharpe 136; Nicholson 6–36
|- 
|10
|15 Jun 1963  
 | Lancashire  Aigburth, Liverpool   
|bgcolor="#FFCC00"|Drawn
 |  
|    Statham 5–45 
|- 
|11
|19 Jun 1963  
 | Glamorgan  Queen's Park, Chesterfield   
|bgcolor="#FF0000"|Lost 
 |  7 wickets
|    Shepherd 7–49 
|- 
|12
|22 Jun 1963  
 | Leicestershire   County Ground, Derby   
|bgcolor="#FFCC00"|Drawn
 |  
|    
|- 
|13
|29 Jun 1963  
 | Cambridge University   Ind Coope Ground, Burton-on-Trent   
|bgcolor="#FFCC00"|Drawn
 |  
|    Hutton 8–50
|- 
|14
|3 Jul 1963  
 |  Middlesex    Rutland Recreation Ground, Ilkeston   
|bgcolor="#FFCC00"|Drawn
 |  
|    Moss 5–47 
|- 
|15
|6 Jul 1963  
 | Pakistan Eaglets  County Ground, Derby   
|bgcolor="#00FF00"|Won 
 |  8 wickets
|    DC Morgan 113; Iqbal 5–103; AB Jackson 7–56 
|- 
|16
|13 Jul 1963  
 | Worcestershire    County Ground, New Road, Worcester   
|bgcolor="#FF0000"|Lost 
 |  101 runs
|    Graveney 100; Flavell 6–46; HL Jackson 5–53 
|- 
|17
|17 Jul 1963  
 | West Indies   Queen's Park, Chesterfield   
|bgcolor="#FF0000"|Lost 
 |  135 runs
|    
|- 
|18
|20 Jul 1963  
 | Nottinghamshire  Rutland Recreation Ground, Ilkeston   
|bgcolor="#FFCC00"|Drawn
 |  
|    Hill 134 
|- 
|19
|24 Jul 1963  
 | Sussex     Central Recreation Ground, Hastings   
|bgcolor="#00FF00"|Won 
 |  13 runs
|    Snow 6–52; Thomson 7–31; HJ Rhodes 6–22 
|- 
|20
|27 Jul 1963  
 | Northamptonshire  County Ground, Northampton   
|bgcolor="#FF0000"|Lost 
 |  Innings and 53 runs
|    Ramsamooj 132; Larter 5–62 
|- 
|21
|31 Jul 1963  
 | Sussex     Queen's Park, Chesterfield   
|bgcolor="#FFCC00"|Drawn
 |  
|    DB Carr 136
|- 
|22
|3 Aug 1963  
 | Warwickshire   County Ground, Derby   
|bgcolor="#FF0000"|Lost 
 |  9 wickets
|    M Smith 144; Edmonds 5–40 
|- 
|23
|7 Aug 1963  
 | Yorkshire   Headingley, Leeds   
|bgcolor="#FF0000"|Lost 
 |  7 wickets
|    
|- 
|24
|10 Aug 1963  
 | Somerset  Clarence Park, Weston-super-Mare   
|bgcolor="#FF0000"|Lost 
 |  192 runs
|    Doughty 6–58 and 5–44
|- 
|25
|14 Aug 1963  
 | Kent   Cheriton Road Sports Ground, Folkestone   
|bgcolor="#FFCC00"|Drawn
 |  
|    Nicholls 211; Harvey 103 
|- 
|26
|17 Aug 1963  
 | Lancashire  Park Road Ground, Buxton   
|bgcolor="#FFCC00"|Drawn
 |  
|    Grieves 114; Statham 6–28
|- 
|27
|21 Aug 1963  
 | Surrey   County Ground, Derby   
|bgcolor="#FFCC00"|Drawn
 |  
|    Sydenham 5–31 and 6–47
|- 
|28
|24 Aug 1963  
 | Hampshire   Queen's Park, Chesterfield   
|bgcolor="#00FF00"|Won 
 |  144 runs
|    HJ Rhodes 5–41 
|- 
|29
|28 Aug 1963  
 | Nottinghamshire    Trent Bridge, Nottingham   
|bgcolor="#FF0000"|Lost 
 |  8 wickets
|    Bolus 136; Corran 5–55 
|- 
|30
|31 Aug 1963  
 | Leicestershire  Grace Road, Leicester   
|bgcolor="#FFCC00"|Drawn
 |  
|    
|- 
|31
|4 Sep 1963  
 |  Middlesex     Lord's Cricket Ground, St John's Wood   
|bgcolor="#FFCC00"|Drawn
 |  
|    
|-

Gillette Cup 
{| class="wikitable" width="70%"
! bgcolor="#efefef" colspan=6 | List of matches
|- bgcolor="#efefef"
!No.
!Date
!V
!Result 
!Margin
!Notes
 |- 
|1st Round
|22 May 1963
| Hampshire Dean Park, Bournemouth  
|bgcolor="#00FF00"|Won 
|  6 runs
|    
|- 
|Quarter final
|12 Jun 1963
|  Lancashire   Old Trafford, Manchester  
|bgcolor="#FF0000"|Lost 
|  5 wickets
|    
|-

Statistics

Competition batting averages

Competition bowling averages

Wicket Keeping
Bob Taylor	
County Championship Catches 74, Stumping 2 
Gillette Cup Catches 3, Stumping 0

See also
Derbyshire County Cricket Club seasons
1963 English cricket season

References

1963 in English cricket
Derbyshire County Cricket Club seasons